Bowlesia incana is a species of flowering plant in the family Apiaceae known by the common name hoary bowlesia. It is native to South America and the southeastern and southwestern United States as far north as Oregon. It can also be found in Pakistan and New Zealand as an introduced species. It grows in many types of habitat. This is a small annual herb growing thin, spreading stems less than 60 centimeters long. The leaves are borne on long petioles and have multilobed rounded or kidney-shaped blades less than 3 centimeters wide. The green herbage of the plant is coated in fine white hairs. The inflorescences of yellow-green flowers appear in the leaf axils. The tiny inflated fruit is only 2 millimeters wide.

External links
Jepson Manual Treatment
USDA Plants Profile
Flora of Pakistan
Photo gallery

Azorelloideae
Flora of Alabama